Oto Pestner (born January 4, 1956 in Celje) is a politician and one of the most prominent singers and composers of popular music from Slovenia. Until 2008, he was the leader of the Slovene vocal group New Swing Quartet.

From 1986 to 1991 and in 1995, he was member of Alpski kvintet (German: Alpenoberkrainer).

Pestner has performed with artists including Golden Gate Quartet, Bobby McFerrin, Mercer Ellington, Dexter Gordon, New York Voices, Sheila Raye Charles, The Brown Sisters, Ladies of Song, B.B. King, Acappella, Ridgewood Baptist Choir, Perpetuum Jazzile, Divas, Oliver Dragojević, The Eugster Brothers and others. Some of his hits include "Vse je lepše, ker te ljubim" (1971), "Trideset let" (1972), "Dan ljubezni" (1975), "Bisere imaš v očeh" (1978), "Tople julijske noči" (1979), "Moja dežela" (1986), "Ciganska kri" (1991), "Dan za zaljubljene" (1993).

He is a candidate for a Slovenian National Assembly, with Party Povežimo Slovenijo.

References

External links 
 Oto Pestner's home page
 Pestner's complete discography

1956 births
Living people
Musicians from Ljubljana
20th-century Slovenian male singers
Slovenian pop singers
Slovenian folk singers
Slovenian gospel singers
Slovenian Sinti people
21st-century Slovenian male singers